Remco Jan Dijkstra  (born 18 August 1972, Zeist) is a Dutch politician. As a member of the People's Party for Freedom and Democracy (Volkspartij voor Vrijheid en Democratie) he has been an MP since 20 September  2012. Previously he was a member of the municipal council of Buren from 2006 to 2011, and subsequently a member of the provincial parliament of Gelderland from 2011 to 2012.

References
  Parlement.com biography

1972 births
Living people
Members of the House of Representatives (Netherlands)
Members of the Provincial Council of Gelderland
Municipal councillors in Gelderland
People from Buren
Politicians from Buren
People from Zeist
People's Party for Freedom and Democracy politicians
21st-century Dutch politicians